Fangani is a small village located 2 km near Petlad in Gujarat, India. The town is near Anand, one of the biggest cities of Gujarat. Fangani has a population of around 3500.

References

Villages in Anand district